La Salle School, Petaling Jaya (simply referred to as La Salle PJ or LSPJ) is a national primary and secondary school in Petaling Jaya, Selangor, Malaysia. It was established in 1959 by the De La Salle Brothers.

The immediate aim in building this school was to ease the pressure for places in St. John's Institution, which was rapidly expanding at the time as well as cater for the needs of the growing township. Its primary and secondary school are formally known today as Sekolah Kebangsaan La Salle Petaling Jaya and Sekolah Menengah Kebangsaan La Salle Petaling Jaya.

The school was administered by the De La Salle Brothers until 1980 for primary and 1988 for secondary. Since then, the heads have been lay individuals appointed by the Ministry of Education in consultation with the De La Salle Brothers in Malaysia.

History 
On 2 April 1956, Brother Lawrence Spitzig, who was then Director of St. John's took a historic step by applying for a piece of land in Petaling Jaya on which to erect a school run by Christian brothers. The vision at that time was to acquire a ten-acre site on which to erect a primary school, with a secondary school to follow later.

As the population grew so did the pressure for places in existing schools, so on 15 July 1959, Brother Lawrence made yet another request for permission to commence work on the construction of six classrooms (now known to all PJ Lasallians as the ‘Old Block’) to house primary classes which had launched La Salle PJ on the educational scene in January 1959. A new building completed in 2003 was to replace the Old Block.

Standing in place of the Old Block is a two-storey New Block. This building houses a total of 10 classes, 2 workshops, a large surau and the long-awaited computer labs.

The Primary School

Head Masters 

 FSC - PAPZ, the group name of the De La Salle Brothers.

The Secondary School

Principals 

FSC means [Latin: Fratres Scholarum Christianarum; French: Frères des écoles chrétiennes];English: Brothers of the Christian Schools]; a Roman Catholic religious  congregation dedicated to education for all (the Last, the Least and the Lost) was founded in France by Saint Jean-Baptiste de La Salle and is now based in Rome.

References

External links 
 

Schools in Selangor
Lasallian schools in Malaysia
Catholic schools in Malaysia
Primary schools in Malaysia
Secondary schools in Malaysia
Educational institutions established in 1959
1959 establishments in Malaya